The Yokohama Women's Marathon was a marathon held in Yokohama, Japan, and hosted by Japan Association of Athletics Federations, TV Asahi, the Asahi Shimbun. It is one of the major Japanese women's marathon races which is used to decide selection for the Olympics, along with the Nagoya Marathon and Osaka International Ladies Marathon.

The competition replaced the Tokyo International Women's Marathon which was held in Tokyo from 1979 until 2008. Following the creation of the annual Tokyo Marathon in 2007, which featured its own annual women's marathon, the sponsors decided to move the women's marathon to Yokohama in 2009.

First held on November 15, 2009, it is scheduled for November every year. The second edition was postponed to February 2011 due to APEC Japan 2010 being held that November and the third edition returned to the usual November timing. In 2012 Lydia Cheromei ran a course record time of 2:23:07 hours.

Winners 
Key:

Course 
Yamashita Park->Industrial Trade Center->Yokohama Customs->Kanagawa Prefectural office->Chinatown->Yamashita Park->Industrial Trade Center->Minato Mirai 21->Yokohama Station->Sakuragichō Station->Yokohama Stadium->Yamanote Park->Yamashita Park->Industrial Trade Center->Minato Mirai 21->Yokohama Station->Sakuragichō Station->Yokohama Stadium->Yamanote Park->Industrial Trade Center->Yamashita Park (Finish)

References

External links 
 



Women's marathons in Japan
Sport in Yokohama
Recurring sporting events established in 2009
Recurring sporting events disestablished in 2014
2009 establishments in Japan
2014 disestablishments in Japan
Defunct sports competitions in Japan
Defunct athletics competitions